m-Terphenyls (also known as meta-terphenyls, meta-diphenylbenzenes, or meta-triphenyls) are organic molecules composed of two phenyl groups bonded to a benzene ring in the one and three positions. The simplest formula is C18H14, but many different substituents can be added to create a diverse class of molecules. Due to the extensive pi-conjugated system, the molecule it has a range of optical properties and because of its size, it is used to control the sterics in reactions with metals and main group elements. This is because of the disubstituted phenyl rings, which create a pocket for molecules and elements to bond without being connected to anything else. It is a popular choice in ligand, and the most chosen amongst the terphenyls because of its benefits in regards to sterics. Although many commercial methods exist to create m-terphenyl compounds, they can also be found naturally in plants such as mulberry trees.

History

Discovery

The earliest known synthesis of meta-terphenyl was completed in 1866 by Pierre Eugène Marcellin Berthelot by heating benzene to high temperatures leading to a mixture of hydrocarbons including a mixture of meta-terphenyl and para-terphenyl. Meta-terphenyl was isolated in 1874 by Guslav Schultz by taking the mixture of the compounds, mixing them in a solvent and allowing meta-terphenyl to melt off as it has a lower melting and boiling point than para-terphenyl. Meta-terphenyl, and other aromatic compounds, remained of much interest to scientists in throughout the end of the 20th century, with many of the physical properties being measured and compared during this time. This also led to the first alternate form of meta-terphenyl synthesis, which involved passing gaseous benzene and toluene through a hot glass tube.

Reactivity 

By the 1930s, focus had shifted to experimenting with the reactivity of meta-terphenyl and its potential use as a ligand. The first verified modified version of meta-terphenyl was created in 1932 by Arthur Wardner and Alexander Lowy and led to the creation of nitro-substituted meta-terphenyls as well as amino-meta-terphenyls from the oxidation of the nitro-substituted compounds. Walter and Kathryn Cook halogenated meta-terphenyl with chlorine and bromine with further applications such as use in as Grignard reaction, the first such suggestion for meta-terphenyl as a ligand for a main group element. They later confirmed their results using the Stepanow Method. This trend continued with C.K. Breadsher and I. Swerlick publishing a review of all known reactions that meta-terphenyl could undergo. G. R. Ames also wrote an article detailing not only reactions of meta-terphenyls, but also covering all the different experimental methods to obtain meta-terphenyl known at the time.

Early synthetic methods

During this time, the method of producing meta-terphenyl had remained the same. While people did experiment with other ways to obtain the compound, for the most part the method of heating benzene in a glass tube remained the primary method. In 1948, however, G. Woods and Irwin Tucker put forth an alternative method. Instead of heating benzene, they found that a combination of dihydroresocinol and two equivalents of phenyllithium would create unsymmetrical meta-terphenyl molecules. This was significant as the previous method required the separation of meta-terphenyl from other compounds and this novel synthesis allowed meta-terphenyls to be the major product and much more easily isolatable. This method would remain the most popular form of making meta-terphenyls until the end of the 20th century.

It was during this time that it was discovered that meta-terphenyls occurred in nature. In 1975, Karl-Werner Glombitza, Hans-Willi Rauwald, and Gert Eckhardt isolated two meta-terphenyls from the algae Fugus vesiculosus. More naturally occurring meta-terphenyls have been isolated since then and have shown promising applications in the field of biochemistry.

Synthesis

Hart Method

As the demand for meta-terphenyl and its derivatives grew through the latter half of the 20th century, it became necessary to increase the yield of reactions producing meta-terphenyls as well as have the ability to uniquely create symmetric and unsymmetric meta-terphenyls to investigate their reactivity as well utilize their increased steric control. Such a method was discovered by Akbar Saednya and Harold Hart in 1986. Using an excess of Grignard reagent that had a phenyl group attached, meta-terphenyl was able to be made quickly, in one step, with a relatively high yield. This method also allowed for a variety of meta-terphenyl compounds to be made as so long as it could successfully be made into a Grignard reagent.

This method continues to remain very popular in terms of the creation of symmetrical meta-terphenyl compounds, but that has not stopped attempts to quicken synthesis, increase yield, and create more sterically bulky m-terphenyls. The method developed by Saednya and Hart has provided the basis for improved synthesis of meta-terphenyls and has often been used as a comparison when it comes to resulting structures and methods. Saednya and Hart continued their work and provided two alternate paths to create meta-terphenyls in 1996. One involved using a halogenated benzene and three equivalents of the phenyl group attached to the benzene. The second involved a dichloro-substituted benzene and butyl lithium followed by two equivalents of the Grignard reagents mentioned above. This led to increased yields of larger terphenyl compounds, however as the size of the substituents has been hypothesized to have a limit due to the increased steric hinderance of the molecule.

New approaches

Novel synthesis methods have continued to be developed to this day. One such method involves using an ultrasound bath to make m-terphenyl compounds. By reacting anionic diphenyl molecules with functional ketones in a solution of potassium hydroxide and DMF in an ultrasound bath, a bulky meta-terphenyl molecule can be obtained. While this method does not have the highest yield, it is much quicker being able to be completed within an hour. Additionally, meta-terphenyl synthesis has begun to become more focused. As opposed to general routes to produce common meta-terphenyl compounds, the shift has been to improve certain derivatives to accomplish particular goals. Examples of this include a method to produce a very sterically hindered meta-terphenyl with the purpose of forming phosphorus-phosphorus double bonds and a heavily fluorinated meta-terphenyl being produced to help stabilize silylium compounds. Additionally, reaction to add other bulky substituents to the center phenyl group has been shown to discourage rotation of the outer phenyl groups in hopes of stabilizing boron and silicon radicals and bonded complexes.

Applications

Main group chemistry

Meta-terphenyls have a variety of uses in fields of chemistry. Their large size can help to sterically force a certain reaction to take place, however they are mainly used to stabilize compounds that would be unstable otherwise. One such area of study is in main group chemistry. An example of this can be seen in the formation of heavier carbene analogues, where bulky meta-terphenyl ligands were able to provide enough steric protection to stabilize newly created bismuthenium and stibenium ions, the first reported carbene analogs that were not in Group 14. Additionally, meta-terphenyl ligands were used to stabilize phosphorus-phosphorus double bonds. This was proven multiple times with a variety of different meta-terphenyl compounds being used to confirm the result and led to the confirmation of the appropriate length of a phosphorus-phosphorus double bond.

Organometallics

Another relevant field of study where meta-terphenyls have shown significant use is organometallics. One such application has been in the creation of paramagnetic organometallic compounds. Due to the steric hinderance provided by m-terphenyls, the creation of certain main group-metal aryl complexes has been made possible, which provide the opportunity to create species with a broad range of reactivity, including with small molecules such as ammonia, carbon dioxide, and oxygen. It has additionally helped in methyl-bridging bonds between transition metal centers.

M-terphenyls have also been quite helpful in getting preliminary structures of divalent lithium and sodium, although both molecules had substantial stabilization from the electron-rich meta-terphenyl group. M-terphenyls have also helped, along with the electronic support of sodium ions, to stabilize the first gallium-gallium triple bond, although this is contested due to the high coordination of the sodium atoms in the complex. A similar approach meshing the methods to form a phosphorus-phosphorus double bonds and a gallium-gallium triple bond allowed researched to create and isolate the first germanium-germanium double bond. Meta-terphenyl continues to play an important part of organometallic chemistry, as well as main group chemistry, due to its kinetic stabilization of molecules and its thermodynamic influence on the energies between molecules.

Biochemistry

Meta-terphenyl ligands can be used on their own in the field of biochemistry. Due to its composition and shape, meta-terphenyl can be used as the basis for the formation of synthetic proteins that can bind to carbohydrates, lectins. This is due to the large twisted shape of meta-terphenyl, when not hindered by bulkier substituents used in organometallics and main-group chemistry, which may opt to increase the rotational barrier of the molecule. In this way, synthetic receptors for sugars such as disaccharides can be bound temporarily before being used in further experiments. This process, while it continues to be developed, has many promising applications such as the prevention and treatment of bacterial infections.

Transition metal chemistry

Another field that often uses meta- terphenyls is transition metal chemistry. They are most relevant in attaining low-coordinate metal centers. This is because their size makes it difficult for a lot of ligands to bond to a metal center. This has shown to be quite useful in the area of reaction chemistry and they have shown to be quite helpful a number of catalysis reactions, such as those involving isocyanates. This has allowed for certain reactions to occur in a shorter amount of time and with generally mild conditions.

References 

Aromatic hydrocarbons
Phenyl compounds